Alexandru Bizim (15 July 1934 – June 2016) was a Romanian Olympic javelin thrower. He represented his country in the men's javelin throw at the 1960 Summer Olympics. His distance was a 68.92 in the qualifiers.

References

External links
 

1934 births
2016 deaths
Romanian male javelin throwers
Olympic athletes of Romania
Athletes (track and field) at the 1960 Summer Olympics
Sportspeople from Bârlad
Universiade bronze medalists for Romania
Universiade medalists in athletics (track and field)
Medalists at the 1959 Summer Universiade